Hüseynbəyli or Guseynbeyli may refer to:
Hüseynbəyli, Barda, Azerbaijan
Hüseynbəyli, Fizuli, Azerbaijan
Hüseynbəyli, Qazakh, Azerbaijan
Zəyəm, Shamkir, Azerbaijan